Tirachoidea is an Asian genus of stick insects in the family Phasmatidae and tribe Pharnaciini.  Species have a known distribution from India, Indochina and West Malesia.

Species
Tirachoidea includes the following species:
 Tirachoidea biceps (Redtenbacher, 1908)
 Tirachoidea cantori (Westwood, 1859)type species (as Phibalosoma cantori Westwood)
 Tirachoidea chiniensis (Seow-Choen, 1998)
 Tirachoidea herberti Hennemann & Conle, 2008
 Tirachoidea inversa (Brunner von Wattenwyl, 1907)
 Tirachoidea jianfenglingensis (Bi, 1994)
 Tirachoidea siamensis Hennemann & Conle, 2008
 Tirachoidea westwoodii (Wood-Mason, 1875)

References

External links
 

Phasmatodea genera
Phasmatodea of Asia
Phasmatidae